Abd al-Wahhab Khalil Abu Zayd (Arabic: عبد الوهاب أبو زيد) is a Saudi translator and poet. He publishes his poetic, literary, and translational works in Saudi newspapers. Among his best-known translations are works by the American singer and poet Bob Dylan.

Publications

Books 

 Li Ma Asha’a (I get what I want), a collection of poetry published by Al-Sharqiyyah Literary Club in 2008.
 Wala Qablaha Min Nesa'ain Wala Ba'adaha Min Ahad (No women exist neither before her nor after her) published by Dar Tawa in 2013.

Translations 

 The Treasury of Sanskrit Poetry, published by the Kalimah project in 2012.
 Gheyab Alasal (Absent honey): selection of poems, by American poet Mark Strand. Published by Dar Mayara in Tunisia in 2017.
 Akhbar Alayyam (Chronicles), by the American poet and singer Bob Dylan. Published by Dar Alrewayat in 2018.

References 

21st-century Saudi Arabian poets
Arab translators
21st-century Arabic writers
1970 births
Living people